Walls of Glass is the debut solo album by former Imperials lead singer Russ Taff, released in 1983 on Myrrh Records. After he left the Imperials in 1981, Taff started work on his first solo album featuring songs that he co-wrote with his wife Tori and his guitarist and songwriter James Hollihan, Jr. "We Will Stand" was released as the first single and became his first Christian radio hit topping the Christian AC chart for 15 weeks. The song is ranked at number 29 by CCM Magazines 100 Greatest Songs in Christian Music. Taff won his first solo Grammy Award (his fourth overall) for Best Gospel Performance, Male at the 26th Grammy Awards. At the 15th GMA Dove Awards, Taff won his third Male Vocalist of the Year title, his first as a solo artist. "We Will Stand" was nominated for Song of the Year twice at the Dove Awards in 1984 and 1985. Walls of Glass reached No. 5 on the Billboard Top Inspirational Albums chart.

Track listing

 Personnel 
 Russ Taff – lead vocals, backing vocals (1, 8, 10)
 Robbie Buchanan – Rhodes piano (1, 4, 5), synthesizers (1, 3, 4, 10), synth bass (1), acoustic piano (3, 4, 5, 10)
 James Newton Howard – acoustic piano (2, 7, 9), synthesizers (2, 5, 7)
 Bill George – Rhodes piano (3)
 Michael Omartian – acoustic piano (6, 8), Rhodes piano (6, 8), synthesizers (6, 8)
 Michael Landau – guitars (1, 2, 4-9)
 Marty Walsh – guitars (1, 4)
 James Hollihan – guitars (3)
 Nathan East – bass (2, 6, 7, 8)
 Richard Hopkins – bass (3)
 Abraham Laboriel – bass (4, 5)
 Mike Baird – drums (1, 4, 5)
 Jeff Porcaro – drums (2, 6, 7, 8)
 John Hammond – drums (3)
 Lenny Castro – percussion (1-8)
 Ernie Watts – horns (2, 8), sax solo (3)
 Charles Loper – horns (2, 8)
 Gary Grant – horns (2, 8)
 Jerry Hey – horns (2, 8), horn arrangements (2, 8)
 David Lasley – backing vocals (1, 3, 4)
 Arnold McCuller – backing vocals (1)
 Bill Champlin – backing vocals (2, 6, 8)
 Tamara Champlin – backing vocals (2, 6)
 Carmen Twillie – backing vocals (2)
 Charlotte Crossley – backing vocals (3, 4, 7)
 Jo Ann Harris – backing vocals (3, 4, 7)
 Bonnie Bramlett – backing vocals (6, 8)
 Franke Previte – harmony vocals (7)
 Laury Boone – backing vocals (10)
 Dony McGuire – backing vocals (10)
 Reba Rambo – backing vocals (10)Backing vocals on "We Will Stand" Laury Boone, Harry Browning, Don Cason, Cynthia Clawson, Ragan Courtney, David Lasley, Arnold McCuller, Bobby Messano, Franke Previte, Susan Pyron Heard, Russ Taff, Tori Taff and Gary Whitlock 

 Production 
 Bill Schnee – producer, engineer 
 Russ Taff – vocal producer (3)
 Jack Joseph Puig – vocal producer (3), additional engineer 
 Daniel Garcia – assistant engineer 
 David Schober – assistant engineer 
 Doug Sax – mastering at The Mastering Lab (Hollywood, California)
 Janet Heard – production assistant 
 Paul Gross – layout, design 
 Gary Whitlock – cover concept, back cover photography 
 Sam Emerson – front cover photography, back cover insert photography

 Charts 

AccoladesGrammy AwardsGMA Dove Awards'
1984 Male Vocalist of the Year

References

1983 debut albums
Russ Taff albums
Myrrh Records albums
Word Records albums